Robert Abensur is a French philatelist who was appointed to the Roll of Distinguished Philatelists in 2018. He has been president of the Académie de philatélie since 2002. He was made a chevalier of the Ordre des Arts et des Lettres in 2009.

References

French philatelists
Living people
Signatories to the Roll of Distinguished Philatelists
Philatelic authors
Year of birth missing (living people)